Tyler Lamb is a Thai-American professional basketball player. He played college basketball for UCLA and Long Beach State. Tyler began his professional career in his mother's homeland, Thailand.

Early life
Lamb was born in West Covina, California. His mother, Cherry, is Thai, and his father, Terry, is American. Lamb attended Mater Dei High in Santa Ana.

College career
Lamb started his college career for the UCLA Bruins in 2010. After three years, he transferred to Long Beach State. After starting all but one game for the Bruins in 2011–12, he was concerned about not receiving enough playing time with Larry Drew II, Shabazz Muhammad, Kyle Anderson, Jordan Adams and Norman Powell in the mix at guard for UCLA. He averaged 5.8 points and 2.3 rebounds per game in his career with the Bruins. In his first season with Long Beach State in 2013–14, Lamb was named second-team all-conference in the Big West Conference.

Professional career
Lamb signed with the TaiwanBeer HeroBears of the T1 League on February 23, 2022.

National team career
In 2017, Tyler Lamb played for the Thai national team at the Southeast Asian Games, where they won bronze. The following year, he made his FIBA debut in the FIBA Asia Cup 2021 SEABA Pre-Qualifier. The national team advanced to the 2021 FIBA Asia Cup qualifiers.

In 2019, he rejoined the national team for the 2019 Southeast Asian Games men's basketball tournament.

References

1991 births
Living people
American expatriate basketball people in Hong Kong
American expatriate basketball people in Thailand
American sportspeople of Thai descent
ASEAN Basketball League players
Basketball players from California
Competitors at the 2019 Southeast Asian Games
Eastern Sports Club basketball players
Long Beach State Beach men's basketball players
Southeast Asian Games medalists in basketball
Tyler Lamb
Sportspeople from West Covina, California
TaiwanBeer HeroBears players
T1 League Asian imports
Thai expatriates in Hong Kong
Thai expatriates in Taiwan
Tyler Lamb
UCLA Bruins men's basketball players